World Coming Down is the fifth studio album by the American gothic metal band Type O Negative. It is considered to be the darkest of the band's releases, having been written after a series of deaths in frontman Peter Steele's family, combined with the desire to break away from the sexually charged themes of the previous albums. It was also the band's first album to reach the Top 40 on the Billboard 200.

Music and lyrics
As with the band's previous album, October Rust, this album also has a 'joke intro': in this case, "Skip It", 11 seconds of staccato band noise meant to sound as if the listener's CD player is skipping. Contrary to common belief, Cassette versions did not have the noise of a tape being 'eaten' by the tape player, it was actually the same as in CD version. However, 2019 released None More Negative vinyl box set re-issue and 2020 released stand-alone vinyl version begins as if the record is damaged and stuck in a locked groove during the intro of "White Slavery". The track ends with the band's guitarist, Kenny Hickey, shouting "Sucker!"

The first song, "White Slavery", deals with cocaine addiction. Discussing his dalliance with the drug and inspiration behind the song in a 1999 Kerrang! interview, Steele recalled: "There were a handful of times that were fucking horrible, but one night in particular was really bad, and that's when I stopped doing it. I was really depressed and homesick, and the worst part is when you're coming down from it. It's five in the morning and there's no one to talk to, you're on a tour bus doing 80mph and you look out the window and it looks like you're on Mars. All I could think about was jumping out of the bus while it was moving, but that would have made too many people happy."

Two other songs, "Everyone I Love Is Dead" and "Everything Dies", touch on the difficulties of watching family members and loved ones die. Another track, "Who Will Save the Sane?", which deals with mental illness and psychiatry, incorporates Steele reciting the number pi to 9 decimal places (3.141592653).

The album contains three "soundscape" tracks, which are named after internal organs, as segues between songs. Each of these songs is intended to suggest the possibilities of the deaths the members of the band may have suffered at the time: "Sinus" as death from cocaine use, "Liver" as death through alcohol abuse and "Lung" as death from smoking. In an ironic foreboding, Steele once told a close friend that he could not bear to listen to "Sinus" after it was mixed and completed, because the sound of the heartbeat escalating to its furious pace after the cocaine-snorting sound effect actually drove him to the point of an anxiety attack because of its realism.

Also included at the end of the album is a cover song, a medley of three Beatles songs. In the liner notes to the album's 2020 vinyl reissue, Hickey stated "All four of us are Beatles freaks" but added ruefully: "Being four idiots and not knowing anything, we didn't realise that The Beatles charge $35,000 per song. They were the most expensive songs in the music industry that you could get rights to for a cover - and we did a medley, so it was three songs! It came out great, but the record company was like, 'This is gonna cost $75,000! You guys are outta your minds! Who's gonna pay it? Not us!'" Keyboardist and producer Josh Silver eventually convinced the label to foot the bill.

An additional song recorded during the album sessions, "12 Black Rainbows," was issued as the B-side for the "Everything Dies" single; later, it was included on the compilation album The Least Worst Of with two other unreleased tracks from the same sessions ("It's Never Enough" and "Stay Out of My Dreams").

The reversed vocal technique of backmasking is used in several places on the album; some segments are more audibly apparent than others. In particular, backmasking during the intro section of "Creepy Green Light", which was originally titled "Spooky Green Light", refers to a third-person "spell" of a friend's intention to be reunited with a dead spouse.

Following its release the members of Type O Negative had mixed opinions about the music on World Coming Down. Keyboardist and producer Josh Silver felt that the music was strong, while Steele said the songs were too strongly connected to an uncomfortable period in his life. Live shows performed since the initial tour to support World Coming Down usually had very few, if any, selections from the album in the set list. However, the band often played the song "World Coming Down" in its entirety during the Dead Again tour.

The album cover features a photo of the Brooklyn Bridge.

Critical reception

World Coming Down received mostly positive reviews. AllMusic critic Steve Huey gave the album a 4-out-of-5 star rating. Adam Wasylyk of Chronicles of Chaos gave World Coming Down a very positive review: "An album that won't be ignored, it's my favourite album of 1999. Hands down." Christopher Thelen of The Daily Vault called the album "a great listen" and wrote that "for the most part", World Coming Down "suggests that" Type O Negative "is doing things right".

The Washington Posts Mark Jenkins wrote that Type O Negative "...shows some unexpected warmth" on the album, adding that "Much of the album thuds and growls, but the refrain of "Pyretta Blaze" is genuinely catchy." Writing for the Daily Herald (Arlington Heights), Jeff Pizek awarded the album three-and-a-half stars out of a possible four, asserting that with the album “the self-proclaimed Drab Four have found a dour medium between tenebrous melody and Sabbathy bad vibes.” Pizek paid special attention to a number of songs; he described “White Slavery” and “All Hallow’s Eve” as perfect bookends for the record and as “definitive Type O Negative songs, [that encompass] all the gloom, rage and tranquillity of their paradigm." He goes further, writing that “Pyretta Blaze” and “Creepy Green Light” showcase the varying sides of the band's personality by boasting crushing doom riffs and poppier sensibilities akin to October Rust, respectively. Pizek later added in his review that “In a just world, this would be the album that breaks Type O Negative, but that remains to be seen.”

In 2021, it was named one of the 20 best metal albums of 1999 by Metal Hammer magazine.

Track listing
All songs written by Peter Steele, except where noted.

Credits
Peter Steele – lead vocals, bass, additional guitars and keyboards
Kenny Hickey – guitars, backing vocals, co-lead vocals (on "World Coming Down" and "All Hallows Eve")
Josh Silver – keyboards, synthesizers, sound effects, electronic and drum programming, backing vocals
Johnny Kelly – drums, percussion, backing vocals

Additional Musicians
Paul Bento – sitar, tamboura (on "World Coming Down" and "Day Tripper (Medley)")
Richard Termini – additional keyboards (on "Pyretta Blaze")

Production
Michael Marciano – recording engineer
George Marino – mastering
Vincent Soyez – photography
Mike Curry – design
Noel Wiggins – design

Charts

References

1999 albums
Roadrunner Records albums
Type O Negative albums